The Bennett Law, officially chapter 519 of the 1889 acts of the Wisconsin Legislature, was a controversial state law passed by the Wisconsin Legislature in 1889 dealing with compulsory education.  The controversial section of the law was a requirement to utilize the English language to teach major subjects in all schools. Because German Catholics and Lutherans each operated large numbers of parochial schools in the state and utilized the German language in the classroom, it was bitterly resented by German Americans, predominantly Catholic Polish Americans, and some Norwegian communities. Although the law was ultimately repealed, there were significant political repercussions in the 1890 and 1892 elections, with Democrats winning control of the Legislature and all state-wide elected offices, as well as both U.S. Senate seats and nearly all of Wisconsin's seats in the U.S. House of Representatives.

Background 

For many years, Wisconsin Republicans, led by state party bosses such as Philetus Sawyer and Elisha W. Keyes, had carefully avoided antagonizing the German American population, since they had considerable support from German voters.  However, in the 1888 state convention, the professionals were pushed aside and the party nominated William D. Hoard, a dairy farmer with no political experience as governor. Hoard won the 1888 election and his inauguration coincided with the start of the 39th Wisconsin Legislature; one of his priorities for the session was reforms to Wisconsin's compulsory education and child labor laws.

Technically, Wisconsin law already required English language instruction in schools, but the requirement was never enforced.  Early in the session, state senator Levi Pond proposed a bill to audit the status of compliance with the state's English language education requirements.  The bill provoked a flood of opposition and was abandoned in the Senate.

The namesake of the law, Michael John Bennett, was serving his second term in the State Assembly and had attended a conference in Chicago with educational leaders from various backgrounds to draft model legislation for educating the youth and ending child labor.  The bulk of the Bennett Law dealt with raising the legal working age to 13 and requiring parents and caregivers to ensure that any child between the ages of 7 and 14 was receiving at least 12 weeks of schooling per year.  Due to its mostly non-controversial nature, the law passed quickly almost without any debate.  The problematic portion occurred in section 5 of the law, which defined a "school" as only an institution which utilized the English language for instructions on reading, writing, math, and U.S. history.

The backlash began shortly after the law was published.  Governor Hoard doubled down on his position and attempted to mobilize the English-speaking population of the state for his reelection bid in 1890, insisting that it was a necessity for all children to speak English.

As opposition swelled, Hoard escalated to a defense of the public school system (which was not under attack): "The little schoolhouse--stand by it!" he cried out. Hoard ridiculed the Germans by claiming that he was the better guardian of their children than their parents or pastors. Hoard counted votes and thought he had a winning coalition by whipping up nativist distrust of Germania as anti-American. In Milwaukee, a predominantly German city where an estimated 86 percent had foreign-born parents, Hoard attacked Germania and religion: 
We must fight alienism and selfish ecclesiasticism.... The parents, the pastors and the church have entered into a conspiracy to darken the understanding of the children, who are denied by cupidity and bigotry the privilege of even the free schools of the state.

The Germans were incensed at the blatant attack not only on their language and culture but also on their religion and the parochial schools were set up and funded by the parents in order to inculcate the community's religious values. Furthermore, the idea that the state could intervene in family life and tell children how to speak was intolerable.

By June 1890, the state's Missouri Synod and Wisconsin Synod (the main German Lutheran groups) had denounced the law. German Catholic priests also denounced the law; Father Johann B. Reindl of Oshkosh referred to it as "unjust and a blow at the German people." After strong lobbying by Catholic Archbishop Frederick Katzer of the Archdiocese of Milwaukee and other parochial leaders, Democrats, led by Yankee William F. Vilas took up the German cause and nominated Milwaukee Mayor George Wilbur Peck, also a Yankee, for governor.

Traditionally Democratic Irish Catholics were initially not as vigorous in opposition to the law, with a substantial section of the community even supporting it, as Hoard had hoped. However, the outpouring of militantly anti-Catholic rhetoric by many of the law's supporters handily alienated a majority of the Irish in Wisconsin, prompting the top Irish newspaper in the state, the Chippewa Falls-based Catholic Citizen, to write that the law represented a convergence of "all the sectarian, bigoted, fanatical and crazy impurities" within the Republican Party which had taken the reins of power. The Germans, for their part, organized thoroughly and supported Peck. Combined with popular reaction against the new Republican tariff, the result was a major victory for the Democrats, their first in decades in Wisconsin. The Edwards law was a similar law in Illinois, where the same forces were at work to produce a Democratic win.

The law was repealed in 1891, but Democrats used the memories to carry Wisconsin and Illinois in the 1892 United States presidential election. It was the last major attack on German language schools until 1914. In 1925 in Pierce v. Society of Sisters, the US Supreme Court made it clear that state  attacks on parochial schools violated the First Amendment to the United States Constitution.

See also
 Compulsory public education in the United States
 Oregon Compulsory Education Act of 1926
 Meyer v. Nebraska

References

Further reading
 Hunt, Thomas C. "The Bennett Law of 1890: Focus of Conflict between Church and State,"  Journal of Church and State, 23:1 (Winter 1981): 69-93.
 Jensen, Richard J. The Winning of the Midwest: Social and Political Conflict, 1888-1896 (1971) online ch 5
 Kellogg, Louise Phelps. "The Bennett Law in Wisconsin," Wisconsin Magazine of History, 2: 1 (September 1918).
 Ulrich, Robert J. The Bennett Law of 1889: Education and Politics in Wisconsin. New York: Arno Press, 1980.
 Whyte, William Foote. "The Bennett Law Campaign in Wisconsin," Wisconsin Magazine of History, 10:4 (1926–1927).
 Wyman, Roger E. "Wisconsin Ethnic Groups and the Election of 1890". Wisconsin Magazine of History, 51:4 (1967-1968): 269-293 .

External links 
 1889 Wisc. Act 519 via Wisconsin Legislature
 Message calling for repeal by Governor George W. Peck, 1891
 Americanization and the Bennett Law at the Wisconsin Historical Society
 Bennett Law at the Encyclopedia of Milwaukee

German-American history
Anti-German sentiment in the United States
Anti-Catholicism in the United States
English-only movement
Political history of Wisconsin
Legal history of Wisconsin
History of education in the United States
1889 in law
1889 in Wisconsin
Language legislation
Repealed United States legislation
United States education law
Education in Wisconsin